Iolaus sibella is a butterfly in the family Lycaenidae first described by Hamilton Herbert Druce in 1910. It is found in Cameroon, the Democratic Republic of the Congo (Ituri), Uganda, western Kenya and Zambia. The habitat consists of forests.

The larvae feed on Globimetula braunii and Englerina woodfordioides.

References

External links

Die Gross-Schmetterlinge der Erde 13: Die Afrikanischen Tagfalter. Plate XIII 68 g

Butterflies described in 1910
Iolaus (butterfly)